Irv Daymond (born October 9, 1962) is a Canadian former professional football player who was an offensive lineman for ten seasons with the Ottawa Rough Riders of the Canadian Football League. He became the offensive line coach at Wilfrid Laurier University in Waterloo, Ontario.

References

External links
Bio

1962 births
Living people
Canadian football offensive linemen
Ottawa Rough Riders players
People from St. Thomas, Ontario
Players of Canadian football from Ontario
Western Mustangs football players